The Academy of St Martin in the Fields (ASMF) is an English chamber orchestra, based in London.

John Churchill, then Master of Music at the London church of St Martin-in-the-Fields, and Neville Marriner founded the orchestra as "The Academy of St. Martin-in-the-Fields", a small, conductorless string group. The ASMF gave its first concert on 13 November 1959, in the church after which it was named. In 1988, the orchestra dropped the hyphens from its full name.

History 
The initial performances as a string orchestra at St Martin-in-the-Fields played a key role in the revival of Baroque performances in England.  The orchestra has since expanded to include winds. It remains flexible in size, changing its make-up to suit its repertoire, which ranges from the Baroque to contemporary works.

Neville Marriner continued to perform obbligatos and concertino solos with the orchestra until 1969, and led the orchestra on recordings until the autumn of 1970, when he switched to conducting from the podium from directing the orchestra from the leader's desk. Marriner held the title of Life President until his death in 2016.  On recordings, besides Marriner, Iona Brown and Kenneth Sillito have led the orchestra, among others.

In 1993, the Academy of St Martin in the Fields became the first – and to date, only – orchestra to be awarded The Queen's Award for Export Achievement.

Since 2000, Murray Perahia has held the title of Principal Guest Conductor of the orchestra, and has made commercial recordings with the orchestra as pianist and conductor.   

In May 2011, the orchestra appointed  Joshua Bell as its new Music Director, the second person to hold the title in the orchestra's history, effective September 2011, with an initial contract of 3 years. In July 2017, the ASMF extended Bell's contract through 2020, an additional three years from his previous contract extension.

Sally Beamish has the title of composer-in-residence with the ASMF, the first composer so affiliated with the ASMF, scheduled through the 2019–2020 season.

Recordings
The orchestra's first recording was for the L'Oiseau-Lyre label at Conway Hall on 25 March 1961. It has since accumulated an extensive discography, and is one of the most recorded chamber orchestras in the world, with over 500 sessions.  Other labels the orchestra has recorded for include Argo, Capriccio, Chandos, Decca, EMI, Hänssler, Hyperion, and Philips. Earlier recordings by the ASMF from the old Philips label have been reissued on Pentatone. The orchestra has also recorded under the names "Argo Chamber Orchestra", "London String Players", and "London Strings".

The soundtrack to the Oscar-winning film Amadeus, a fictional account of the life of the composer Wolfgang Amadeus Mozart and his bitter feud with rival Antonio Salieri features many of Mozart's most popular compositions. Recorded by the Academy and Sir Neville Marriner in 1984, the soundtrack to Amadeus reached #1 in the Billboard Classical Albums Chart, #56 in the Billboard Popular Albums Chart, has sold over 6.5 million copies to date and received 13 Gold Discs, making it one of the most popular classical music recordings of all time. The partnership between the Academy and its founder Sir Neville Marriner is the most recorded of any orchestra and conductor.

Chamber Ensemble 
The Academy of St Martin in the Fields Chamber Ensemble was created in 1967 to perform the larger chamber works with players who customarily worked together, instead of the usual string quartet with additional guests. Drawn from the principal players of the Academy and led by violinist Tomo Keller, the Chamber Ensemble performs in all shapes and sizes, from string quintets to octets, and in various other configurations featuring winds. Its touring commitments are extensive and include regular tours of Europe and North America, whilst recording contracts with Philips Classics, Hyperion, and Chandos have led to the release of over thirty CDs.

References

Sources
 Stuart, Philip. Marriner and the Academy – A Record Partnership. London: Academy of St. Martin in the Fields, 1999.
Harries, Meirion and Susie. The Academy of St Martin in the Fields, London, 1981.

External links
 Official Academy of St Martin in the Fields website
 Academy of St Martin in the Fields on Discogs
 Kenneth Sillito profile Kenneth Sillito discography

Chamber orchestras
London orchestras
Musical groups established in 1959
1959 establishments in England